Pol-e Angur (also Romanized as Pol-e Angūr and Pol Angūr; also known as Angoorpol, Angūr-e Pahel, Pahal, Pahel, Pahel Angūr, Pol, and Pūhāl) is a village in Khamir Rural District, in the Central District of Khamir County, Hormozgan Province, Iran. At the 2006 census, its population was 588, in 118 families.

References 

Populated places in Khamir County